The 1926 Stanley Cup Finals saw the National Hockey League (NHL) champion Montreal Maroons, in their first Finals appearance, defeat the Western Hockey League (WHL) and defending Stanley Cup champion Victoria Cougars three games to one in the best-of-five game series. This was the last time a non-NHL team would contest for the Cup – the WHL folded following the 1926 Finals leaving the Cup to be contested solely by NHL clubs thereafter.

Paths to the Finals
The Cougars finished the 1925–26 WHL regular season in third place, but eventually upset the Edmonton Eskimos in the WHL championship by a combined score of 5–3 to reach the Stanley Cup Finals. Meanwhile, the Maroons finished the NHL regular season in second place. Montreal went on to beat the third seed Pittsburgh Pirates and then defeated the first place Ottawa Senators 2–1 in a two-game total goals series, thus capturing the Prince of Wales Trophy and the right to play Victoria for the Cup.

Game summaries
All of the games in the 1926 Cup Finals were played at the Montreal Forum. Aided by three future Hockey Hall of Famers, the Maroons ended up dominating the series. Goaltender Clint Benedict, who previously helped Ottawa in three Cup championships, recorded three shutouts. Rookie Nels Stewart scored 6 of Montreal's 10 overall goals in the 4 games. Punch Broadbent also recorded a goal for the Maroons. The Cougars' lone win came in game three, 3–2.

Nels Stewart scored both goals in the fourth game to win the series. Stewart had given his stick to a fan after the playoff series against Ottawa. He asked for and retrieved the stick back from the fan prior to the fourth game. He then gave back the stick to the fan after game four.

Stanley Cup engraving
The 1926 Stanley Cup was presented to Maroons captain Dunc Munro by the trophy's trustee William Foran, following the Maroons 2–0 win over the Cougars in game four.

The following Maroons players and staff had their names engraved on the Stanley Cup

1925–26 Montreal Maroons

See also
1925–26 NHL season
1925–26 WHL season

References

 

Notes

Stanley Cup
Stanley Cup Finals
Stan
Western Canada Hockey League postseason
Stanley
March 1926 sports events
April 1926 sports events
Ice hockey competitions in Montreal
1920s in Montreal
1926 in Quebec